Benton Airpark may refer to:

Benton Field, also known as Benton Airpark, in Redding, California, United States (FAA: O85)
Lloyd Stearman Field, also known as Benton Airpark, in Benton, Kansas, United States (FAA: 1K1)

See also
Benton Airport (disambiguation)